Jacquin Jansen (born 27 May 1986) is a South African rugby union player who last played for the . His regular position is full-back or fly-half.

Career

Youth

Senior career
Jansen made his senior debut the following season, coming on as a late substitution in the 2008 Currie Cup Premier Division match against the  – still his only appearance in the Currie Cup Premier Division.

Jansen made four appearances in the 2009 Vodacom Cup (starting two games as fly-half), but only became a regular starter the following season. He made twenty appearances and scored 176 points in 2010. 53 points in the 2010 Vodacom Cup made him eighth top scorer and he did even better in the 2010 Currie Cup First Division, finishing second in the scoring charts with 119 points. He also scored four points in the Currie Cup pre-season compulsory friendlies.

Jansen's 2011 was curtailed by shoulder and hamstring injuries, making just four appearances, but he returned to the Boland first team in 2012, making 20 appearances and scoring 94 points in the 2012 Vodacom Cup and Currie Cup competitions.

In 2013, Jansen was included in a South Africa President's XV team that played in the 2013 IRB Tbilisi Cup and won the tournament after winning all three matches.

Jansen joined  for the start of the 2014 season.

References

South African rugby union players
Living people
1986 births
Sportspeople from Paarl
Boland Cavaliers players
Rugby union fly-halves
Rugby union players from the Western Cape
Griquas (rugby union) players
SWD Eagles players